Norbert Kobielski (born 28 January 1997) is a Polish athlete specialising in the high jump. He won a bronze medal at the 2019 European U23 Championships.

His personal bests are 2.28 metres outdoors (Płock 2020) and 2.29 metres indoors (Toruń 2020, Instambul 2023).

International competitions

1No mark in the final

References

1997 births
Living people
Polish male high jumpers
20th-century Polish people
21st-century Polish people